The Bogies is a comic strip in The Dandy and Turbo Extreme. It features bunches of nasal mucus and their adventures. Many of the characters names are twists on some famous person or character from pop culture. These characters will often act like celebrities but in a gross manner. It originally appeared in Toxic in 2005, but moved to The Dandy in June 2008. It has been drawn since the beginning by Nigel Auchterlounie. The last strip in Toxic was a Hock Hogan one, and the first Dandy one was a Splatman and Gobbin story.

Collected Editions
Two 56 page books have been given away in issues of The Dandy Xtreme which collect together a large number of stories from the series as well as adding facts, puzzles, jokes and posters. The books were titled The Bogies Exclusive Mini Mag! and The Bogies Exclusive Mini Mag: The Big Green Slimy One!.

Merchandise

Toys
The Bogies are well known for a range of small collectable toys of the characters from the comics. These include Pocket Bogies, Giant Bogies and Bogie Key Chains.

Trading Cards and Stickers
Bogies Battle Cards is a trump trading card game featuring the characters from the franchise. Seven cards are in each pack and 100 cards to collect in total. There is also a sticker collection which builds up parts of comic strips in the album.

Other
T-shirts and stationary are also made.

External links
 http://www.thebogies.com/

References

Dandy strips
2005 comics debuts
2008 comics endings
Parody comics
Humor comics
Satirical comics
British comics characters
Comics characters introduced in 2005